The Sagem myX-2 is a small and lightweight phone, with other similar models such as the myX-3, myX-8 and myC-2. It is manufactured by SAGEM Communication.

Features and specifications

Dimensions 
Depth-top: 19 mm
Depth-bottom: 15 mm
Length: 98 mm - 100 mm
Width: 42 mm

Battery 
Battery Life: 340 hours
Battery Voltage: 3.77 V
Charging Time: 1hr 30 min to 2h

Other 
WAP Enabled: Yes
WAP Speed: 48.3 kbit/s
Pin Codes: 2
Loading Time: 5 seconds (approx.)

Usability 
Screen Depth: 256 colors
Animated Menu: Yes
Menu Style: Scroll up images
Signal Range: Good/average
Aerial Hidden: Yes

Useful features 
The Sagem has a useful WAP feature, which although slow, can be an emergency measure.

The myX-2 does not have a camera feature.

The Sagem also has a game with 4 options.

Games 
Sweetheart: a picture puzzle where you have to bring a couple together which are separated by hearts and squares.
Picture Puzzle 9 pieces: A nine piece picture puzzle, easy difficulty
Picture Puzzle 16 pieces: A sixteen piece picture puzzle, medium difficulty
Picture Puzzle 25 pieces: Hardest of the 3 picture puzzles, 25 pieces.

All 4 games have a high score record stored on the phone.

Special features 
The Sagem myX-2 has a few special features such as a calculator and currency converter. It also has a hidden menu.

Hidden menu 
Accessed by pressing '*' while in the menu, this hidden menu will show battery voltage, application versions, test the LCD and allows you to lock the SIM, using 'SIM Lock' (requires password).

LCD tester 
Red Screen: Simply makes the screen red to test it.
Green Screen: Simply makes the screen green to test it.
Blue Screen: Simply makes the screen blue to test it.
Photo: Displays all the colours the screen/phone can handle it one image, on a grid.
Vibrate: Vibrates the phone to see the reaction from the screen.

Sim lock 
Simply locks the sim card, requires a password.
35227500345365-3

Application 
Battery Status: Displays the current battery output in volts (V)
Version: Displays Version Info

PROM 
Displays the IMEI info.

Calculator 
Accessed easily from the Accessories menu, this feature can be useful if you don't have a calculator to hand. It includes the basic add, subtract, divide, multiply.

Currency converter 
No, not a live feed, but a useful converter when on the move. You can set the current rate and currency name.

See also 
 Mobile phone

References

External links
Sagem Communication

Safran mobile phones